Apple Assembly Line was a monthly newsletter edited by Bob Sander-Cederlof from October 1980 through May 1988. The publisher was S-C Software Corporation based in Dallas, Texas. The newsletter focused on assembly language programming for the Apple II personal computer. Initially, the programs were only written for the 6502 microprocessor, but this expanded to the 65C02, 65802, and 65816 microprocessors as the Apple II family continued to develop.

Sander-Cederlof used the S-C Macro Assembler, which he had authored and sold himself, to publish his programs. At its peak, the newsletter had over 1000 subscribers–mainly those learning to program in assembly language–with issues being mailed all over the world.

In a retrospective of Apple II periodicals, Steven Weyhrich wrote:

See also 

 List of publications and periodicals devoted to the Apple II

References

External links
 Official archive
 Dowloadable programs

1980 establishments in Texas
1988 disestablishments in Texas
Apple II periodicals
Defunct computer magazines published in the United States
Magazines established in 1980
Magazines disestablished in 1988
Magazines published in Texas
Mass media in Dallas
Monthly magazines published in the United States
Newsletters
Science and technology magazines published in the United States